E. W. Cannon House and Store is a historic home and general store located at Hartsville, Darlington County, South Carolina.  The main house was built about 1880 and incorporates a small one-story residence built about 1840 that now serves as a rear wing. It is a two-story, rectangular, frame residence with weatherboard siding. It features a one-story hip roof porch that extends across the full façade. The store was built about 1870 and is located to the rear of the house. It is a -story, rectangular, hand-hewn heavy timber-frame building that served as a post office from 1873 to 1878. Also on the property are a contributing frame garage (c. 1930) and a frame smokehouse (c. 1880–1900).  The house and store were built by Elihu W. Cannon (1841-1911), prominent Hartsville farmer, postmaster, and Darlington County politician.

It was listed on the National Register of Historic Places in 1991.

References

Houses on the National Register of Historic Places in South Carolina
Commercial buildings on the National Register of Historic Places in South Carolina
Commercial buildings completed in 1870
Houses completed in 1880
Houses in Hartsville, South Carolina
National Register of Historic Places in Darlington County, South Carolina
Buildings and structures in Hartsville, South Carolina